Yvette Alloo (21 June 1930 – 23 September 2020) was a Belgian Paralympic table tennis player. She was the first Belgian to win a gold medal at a Paralympic Games.

Biography
Born in Brussels in 1930, Alloo was paralyzed in her legs at the age of 15. She met her husband, Guy Herman, at the 1960 Summer Paralympics in Rome.

Alloo began playing table tennis in 1955 while in rehabilitation in Brussels. In 1960, she was one of 15 Belgian athletes to participate in the Paralympics. She competed in table tennis and fencing, taking home the gold medal in table tennis. She won a second gold medal at the 1964 Summer Paralympics in Tokyo. She ended her sporting career in 1965.

Alloo was one of the founding members of the Belgian Sports Federation for the Disabled, which would later become the Belgian Paralympic Committee. She was secretary of the trauma and rehabilitation center at Brugmann Hospital in Brussels for 35 years.

Yvette Alloo died on 23 September 2020 aged 90.

References

1930 births
2020 deaths
Sportspeople from Brussels
Paralympic table tennis players of Belgium
Medalists at the 1964 Summer Paralympics
Medalists at the 1960 Summer Paralympics
Belgian female table tennis players